Dorsa Ewing is a wrinkle ridge at  in Oceanus Procellarum on the Moon. It is 262 km long and was named after American geophysicist William Maurice Ewing.

References

Ewing